Manon Bollegraf and Rennae Stubbs were the defending champions but only Stubbs competed that year with Lisa Raymond.

Raymond and Stubbs lost in the semifinals to Lori McNeil and Nathalie Tauziat.

Elizabeth Smylie and Linda Wild won in the final 6–3, 3–6, 6–1 against McNeil and Tauziat.

Seeds
Champion seeds are indicated in bold text while text in italics indicates the round in which those seeds were eliminated. The top four seeded teams received byes into the second round.

Draw

Finals

Top half

Bottom half

External links
 1996 DFS Classic Draws
 ITF Tournament Page
 ITF doubles results page

Birmingham Classic (tennis)
1996 WTA Tour